The Debutante Stakes is an American Thoroughbred horse race held annually during the last week of June at Churchill Downs in Louisville, Kentucky. A listed stakes event open to two-year-old fillies, it is contested on dirt over a distance of six furlongs.

It first became a Grade III race in 1996. It was changed from 5.5 furlongs to 6 furlongs in 2006. In 2012, the race was downgraded to listed status.

Records
Speed record
 1:09.27 – Rated Feisty (2007) (at current distance of 6 furlongs)
 1:02.52 – Cashier's Dream (2001) (at previous distance of 5.5 furlongs)

Most wins by a trainer
 7 – D. Wayne Lukas (1986, 1989, 1995, 1997, 2003, 2004, 2009)

Most wins by a jockey
 3 – Pat Day (1996, 1997, 2002, 2004)
 3 – Robby Albarado (2008, 2010, 2014)

Winners since 1995

Earlier winners

1994 – Chargedupsycamore
1993 – Fly Love
1992 – Hollywood Wildcat
1991 – Greenhaven Lane
1990 – Barbara's Nemesis
1989 – Icy Folly
1988 – Seaquay
1987 – Bold Lady Anne
1986 – Burnished Bright
1985 – Tricky Fingers
1984 – Knot
1983 – Arabizon
1982 – Ice Fantasy
1981 – Pure Platinum
1980 – Excitable Lady
1979 – lissy
1978 – Nervous John
1977 – Sweet Little Lady
1976 – Olden
1975 – Answer
1974 – Sun and Snow
1973 – Me and Connie
1972 – Sylva Mill
1971 – Cautious Bidder
1970 – Misty Joy
1969 – Little Tudor
1968 – Alert Princess
1967 – Jet To Market
1966 – Furl Sail
1965 – Ole Liz
1964 – Mississippi Mama
1963 – Wood Nymph
1962 – Speedwell
1961 – Helfersartin
1960 – Bright Silver
1959 – Airmans Guide
1958 – Patty's Choice
1957 – Margaretta
1956 – Delamar
1955 – Cherry
1954 – Gambetta
1953 – Golly
1952 – Bubbley
1951 – Crownlet
1950 – Juliet's Nurse
1949 – Aunt Jayne Z
1948 – Acoma
1947 – Bewitch
1946 – Blue Grass
1945 – Breezy Louise
1944 – Flyweight
1943 – Whirlabout
1942 – Trustee
1941 – Royal Martha
1940 – Wise Moss
1939 – Downy Pillow
1938 – Dolly Whisk
1931 – Butter Beans
1930 – Betty Derr
1929 – Alcibiades
1928 – Port Harlem
1927 – Anita Peabody
1926 – Thirteen Sixty
1925 – Epsomite
1924 – Kitty Pat
1923 – Edna V
1922 – Sympathy
1921 – Fair Phantom
1920 – Bit of White
1919 – Talisman
1918 – Regalo
1917 – Ocean Sweep
1916 – Rosabel
1915 – Little Sister
1914 – Climber
1913 – Robinetta
1912 – Briar Path
1911 – Calisse
1910 – Round The World
1909 – Ethelburg
1908 – Crystal Maid
1907 – Ancient
1906 – Lillie Turner
1905 – Beautiful Bess
1904 – Miss Inez
1903 – White Plume
1902 – Olefiant
1901 – Autumn Leaves
1900 – Sinfi
1899 – Mollie Newman
1898 – Rush
1897 – Mary Black
1896 – Cleophus
1895 – Amanda

References

External links
 The 2008 Debutante Stakes at Churchill Downs

Churchill Downs horse races
Flat horse races for two-year-old fillies
Graded stakes races in the United States
Recurring sporting events established in 1895
1895 establishments in Kentucky